Phantom of the Rue Morgue is a 1954 American mystery horror film directed by Roy Del Ruth and starring Karl Malden, Claude Dauphin and Patricia Medina. The film is an adaptation of Edgar Allan Poe's 1841 short story The Murders in the Rue Morgue.

Warner Bros. released several 3D productions during the 1950s, including the big-budget The Charge at Feather River (1953). Following another western, The Moonlighter (1953), starring Barbara Stanwyck and Fred MacMurray, the studio attempted to repeat the success they had with House of Wax the previous year. This movie was based on the same story which had formed the basis of a 1932 horror film which stars Bela Lugosi.

Plot
In France in the 1870s, a string of strange murders happen in the Rue Morgue. The authorities are baffled, but they do have one man who may have the answers, Prof. Dupin.

When Dupin is approached by the police to help, he agrees. Soon a set of suspects are found, including a sailor named Jacques and a professor named Marais, who is involved in unauthorized (and bizarre) animal experiments.

Cast
Karl Malden as Dr. Marais
Claude Dauphin as Insp. Bonnard
Patricia Medina as Jeanette
Steve Forrest as Prof. Paul Dupin
Allyn Ann McLerie as Yvonne
Anthony Caruso as Jacques the One-Eyed  
Veola Vonn as Arlette  
Dolores Dorn as Camille  
Merv Griffin as Georges Brevert  
Paul Richards as Rene the Knife-thrower  
Rolfe Sedan as LeBon 
Erin O'Brien-Moore as Wardrobe Woman
Charles Gemora as Sultan, The Gorilla 
The Flying Zacchinis as Themselves
 Tito Vuolo as 	Pignatelli 
 Marie Blake as 	Marie 
 Henry Kulky as Maurice,  Sailor 
 Leonard Penn as Gendarme Dumas 
 Frank Lackteen as Gendarme Chavet 
 George J. Lewis as Gendarme Duval 
 Rico Alaniz as Gendarme
 Belle Mitchell as Concierge 
 Creighton Hale as Concierge's Husband

References

Bibliography
 Aitken, Stuart C. & Zonn, Leo E. Place, Power, Situation and Spectacle: A Geography of Film.  Rowman & Littlefield Publishers, 1994.
 Palmer, Barton R. Nineteenth-Century American Fiction on Screen. Cambridge University Press, 2007.

External links

1954 films
1954 3D films
Films based on The Murders in the Rue Morgue
Films directed by Roy Del Ruth
Films scored by David Buttolph
American serial killer films
Warner Bros. films
1950s English-language films
Films set in the 1870s
Films set in Paris
American mystery films
1950s mystery films
American historical films
1950s historical films
Remakes of American films
1950s American films